San Jose del Monte's at-large congressional district is the sole congressional district of the Philippines in the city of San Jose del Monte and one of seven in the province of Bulacan. It has been represented in the House of Representatives since 2004. San Jose del Monte first elected a single representative city-wide at-large for the 13th Congress following the passage of Republic Act No. 9230 in 2003 which amended the 2000 San Jose del Monte City Charter (Republic Act No. 8797). Before 2004, the city was represented in the nation's lower house as part of Bulacan's 4th, Bulacan's 2nd and Region III's at-large districts. It is currently represented in the 18th Congress by Florida P. Robes of the PDP-Laban.

Representation history

Election results

2022

2019

2016

2013

2010

See also
Legislative districts of Bulacan
Legislative districts of San Jose del Monte

References

Congressional districts of the Philippines
Politics of San Jose del Monte
2003 establishments in the Philippines
At-large congressional districts of the Philippines
Congressional districts of Central Luzon
Constituencies established in 2003